Cliffy or Cliffie may refer to:

People
 Cliffy Drysdale, former professional tennis player
 Cliffie Grinde, former member of the Norwegian folk rock band Vamp
 Cliffie Hodgson, player coach of Broadstreet Rugby Club and point-scoring record holder at Coventry R.F.C.
 Cliffy Huntington, stage name of Cliff Powell, member of the punk band The Huntingtons
 Cliffy, a nickname of Cliff Lyons (born 1961), indigenous Australian former rugby league footballer
 Cliffy Rylie, 2017 winner of the South East Asian Mathematics Competition
 Cliffie Stone, stage name of Clifford Gilpin Snyder (1917–1998), American country singer, musician, record producer, music publisher and radio and TV personality
 Cliffy the Clown (fl. 1950s), American clown
 "Cliffie", a student at Radcliffe College, Cambridge, Massachusetts

Other uses
 Cliffy (film), a 2013 telemovie about Cliff Young's 1983 ultramarathon run
 "Cliffy", an episode of the TV series The Rookies
 Cliffy Island, Victoria, Australia

See also
 Cliff

Lists of people by nickname
Hypocorisms